The 2002 IAAF World Cross Country Championships took place on March 23/24, 2002.  The races were held at the Leopardstown Racecourse, Dún Laoghaire–Rathdown, near Dublin, Ireland.  Reports of the event were given in The New York Times, in the Herald,  and for the IAAF.

New scores for team results were introduced.

Complete results for senior men, for senior men's teams, for men's short race, for men's short race teams, for junior men, for junior men's teams, senior women, for senior women's teams, for women's short race, for women's short race teams, for junior women,  for junior women's teams, medallists, and the results of British athletes who took part were published.

Medallists

Race results

Senior men's race (11.998 km)

Note: Athletes in parentheses did not score for the team result (n/s: nonscorer)

Men's short race (4.208 km)

Note: Athletes in parentheses did not score for the team result (n/s: nonscorer)

Junior men's race (7.974 km)

Note: Athletes in parentheses did not score for the team result (n/s: nonscorer)

Senior women's race (7.974 km)

Note: Athletes in parentheses did not score for the team result (n/s: nonscorer)

Women's short race (4.208 km)

Note: Athletes in parentheses did not score for the team result (n/s: nonscorer)

Junior women's race (5.962 km)

Note: Athletes in parentheses did not score for the team result (n/s: nonscorer)

Medal table (unofficial)

Note: Totals include both individual and team medals, with medals in the team competition counting as one medal.

Participation
According to an unofficial count, 664 athletes from 59 countries participated. This is in agreement with the official numbers as published.

 (30)
 (3)
 (5)
 (19)
 (1)
 (4)
 (27)
 (2)
 (4)
 (34)
 (2)
 (5)
 (1)
 (1)
 (3)
 (15)
 (35)
 (26)
 (4)
 (36)
 (31)
 (27)
 (2)
 (35)
 (4)
 (2)
 (11)
 (23)
 (6)
 (8)
 (1)
 (1)
 (22)
 (5)
 (15)
 (4)
 (2)
 (2)
 (1)
 (14)
 (36)
 (6)
 (5)
 (2)
 (2)
 (2)
 (2)
 (13)
 (6)
 (3)
 (2)
 (4)
 (8)
 (36)
 (36)
 (16)
 (3)
 (6)
 (3)

See also
 2002 IAAF World Cross Country Championships – Senior men's race
 2002 IAAF World Cross Country Championships – Men's short race
 2002 IAAF World Cross Country Championships – Junior men's race
 2002 IAAF World Cross Country Championships – Senior women's race
 2002 IAAF World Cross Country Championships – Women's short race
 2002 IAAF World Cross Country Championships – Junior women's race
 2002 in athletics (track and field)

References

External links
Official site

 
2002
Cross Country Championships
C
2002
Athletics in Dún Laoghaire–Rathdown
Cross country running in Ireland
March 2002 sports events in Europe